Poor Things is a novel by Scottish writer Alasdair Gray, published in 1992.  It won the Whitbread Novel Award in 1992 and the Guardian Fiction Prize for 1992.

The novel was called "a magnificently brisk, funny, dirty, brainy book" by the London Review of Books and is a departure from Gray's usual subject-matter of Glasgow realism and fantasy.  However, its Victorian narrative takes in Gray's previous concerns with social inequalities, relationships, memory and identity.

Story

The main body of the work centres on Bella Baxter, a woman whose early life and identity are the subject of some ambiguity. That ambiguity is complicated by her husband Archibald McCandless's autobiography, "Episodes from the Early Life of a Scottish Public Health Officer," which distorts the truth about his life with Bella. This is followed by Bella's (or Victoria's) refutation of its facts, suggesting that her "poor fool" of a husband has concocted a life for her from the prevailing gothic and romantic motifs of the period: it "positively stinks of all that was morbid in that most morbid of centuries". This is reinforced by the novel's intricate echoes of Mary Shelley's Frankenstein.

These fictitious historical documents are prefaced with an introduction by one Alasdair Gray, who presents himself as the editor of the following text, and relates the "discovery" of the papers by his real-life friends, Michael Donnelly and Elspeth King.  The introduction also hosts a critique of Glasgow City Council's treatment of its culture and heritage in the neglect of the local history museum, and a brief mention of Glasgow's time as the European Capital of Culture in 1990, which would be the subject of a more sustained satire in his novel Something Leather.

Film adaptation 

A film adaptation of the book is in production with Yorgos Lanthimos set to direct and Tony McNamara writing the script. The cast includes Emma Stone, Willem Dafoe, Ramy Youssef, Margaret Qualley and Mark Ruffalo among others.

Notes
Poor Things contains illustrations by Alasdair Gray, which the text claims are by the Scottish etcher and illustrator William Strang.  There are also punning additions of fragments of images from Gray's Anatomy.  One feature of the novel which has also attracted comment is the page of review quotes which also features a printed erratum strip.  Some of these reviews are patently fictitious (such as those from the Skiberdeen Eagle and the Private Nose) and others are attributed to real publications, but seem so harsh that their authenticity is called into question.

References

Sources

Further reading
"Alasdair Gray, Poor Things". 2008. In Nick Bentley, Contemporary British Fiction, 44-52. Edinburgh: Edinburgh University Press. .
Kaczvinsky, Donald P. "Making up for Lost Time": Scotland, Stories, and the Self in Alasdair Gray's" Poor Things." Contemporary Literature 42.4 (2001): 775-799.
Hobsbaum, Philip. "Unreliable Narrators: Poor Things and its Paradigms." The Glasgow Review 3 (1995): 37.
McCormick, Ian D., "Alasdair Gray and the Making of the modern Scottish Grotesque" in Proceedings of the Conference on Regional Europe: Voice and Form (Vitoria, Spain; University of Liverpool, 1994)
Gray, Alasdair, James Kelman, and Tom Toremans. "An Interview with Alasdair Gray and James Kelman." Contemporary Literature 44.4 (2003): 565-586.
March, Cristie. "Bella and the Beast (and a Few Dragons, Too): Alasdair Gray and the Social Resistance of the Grotesque." Critique: Studies in Contemporary Fiction 43.4 (2002): 323-346.
Hammond, Jennifer. Alasdair Gray: A Postmodernist Reading of" Lanark"," 1982 Janine," and" Poor Things". Diss. University of North Carolina at Wilmington, 1999.
McMunnigall, Alan. "Alasdair Gray and Postmodemism." Studies in Scottish Literature 33.1 (2004): 26.

1992 British novels
Costa Book Award-winning works
Novels by Alasdair Gray
Novels set in Scotland
Novels set in Glasgow
1992 in Scotland
Bloomsbury Publishing books